Ceratitis penicillata is a species of fruit fly from the family Tephritidae.

References 

Dacinae
Agricultural pest insects